The Caspar CS 14 was a German military aircraft built in the 1920s. At first it was seen as a single seat fighter but was later modified to the reconnaissance role with a second seat.

Design and development

The Caspar CS 14 was designed by Caspar's engineer E. von Lössl but built in Copenhagen by Dansk Aero in order to avoid the restrictions on military aircraft construction imposed on Germany by the Allies after World War I. It was an equal span, two bay biplane powered by a  Napier Lion W-12.

Apart from the more powerful engine and a  increase in the span of the rectangular inner panels and a consequent increase in wing area, the CS 14 was unchanged from the earlier Caspar CJ 14.

Operational history

Like its predecessor the CJ 14, the CS 14 failed to sell. Despite the proposed change in role enabled by the second seat only one was built and development was ended in 1926.

Specifications (two seat variant)

References

Biplanes
Single-engined tractor aircraft
1920s German fighter aircraft
CS014
Aircraft first flown in 1924